PIXELearning is a learning technologies company specialising in educational game software.  The company was founded by Kevin Corti and Suraj Rana in 2002, both of whom attended Coventry University. PIXELearning is based in Coventry, UK. The company has won an ASTD award.

Products and Technology
LearningBeans is a game-based learning platform. LearningBeans uses Flash technology and consists of a number of tools and APIs which are used to create game applications.

Awards
 Most Engaging & Popular Educational Game (2009) - runner up: The Business Game ASG Awards
 Best use of new technology for e-Learning (2008) DevLearn demofest: Our Worlds of Makrini DevLearn 08
 ASTD Excellence in Practice Award (2007): Audit training simulation for big 4 accountancy firm ASTD

References

Education companies of the United Kingdom
Companies based in Coventry
2002 establishments in the United Kingdom